San Pietro in Selci is an ancient church in Volterra, Italy.

A church was initially established by Guiscard, Marquis of Tuscany in 1005, and part of the building we see today dates to the 12th century, but sports today a later Baroque facade with statues in tufa of San Lino and Saint Giusto by Leonardo Ricciarelli.

The interior contains a painting of a Madonna with Child and Saints by the 15th century Master of Volterra, two canvases by Niccolò Circignani depicting respectively an Annunciation and the Glory of the Virgin,  a canvas by Francesco Brini depicting an Immaculate Conception and a painted stucco with a Madonna and Child.

Sources
 Italian Wikipedia entry

Pietro in Selci